Lamang (Laamang) is an Afro-Asiatic language cluster of Nigeria. Blench (2006) classifies the Woga variety as a separate language.

Varieties
Blench (2019) lists these language varieties as are part of the Lamang cluster.

Zaladva (Zәlәdvә) (Lamang North)
Ghumbagha (Lamang Central)
Ghudavan (Lamang South)

References 

Biu-Mandara languages
Languages of Nigeria